Leucophoropterini is a tribe of plant bugs in the family Miridae. There are more than 20 genera and over 100 species in Leucophoropterini. Most species of this tribe are found in eastern Asia and Australia, with a single genus, Tuxedo, found in North America.

Genera
These 26 genera belong to the tribe Leucophoropterini:

 Subtribe Leucophoropterina Schuh, 1974
 Abuyogocoris Schuh, 1984 - eastern Asia
 Aitkenia Carvalho & Gross, 1982 - Australia
 Arafuramiris Schuh, 1984 - eastern Asia, Australia
 Ausejanus Menard & Schuh, 2011 - Australia, New Zealand
 Austrodapus Menard & Schuh, 2011 - Australia
 Biromiris Schuh, 1984 - eastern Asia, Australia
 Blesingia Carvalho & Gross, 1982 - eastern Asia, Australia
 Collessicoris Carvalho & Gross, 1982 - Australia
 Ctypomiris Schuh, 1984 - eastern Asia
 Gulacapsus Schuh, 1984 - eastern Asia, Australia
 Johnstonsonius Menard & Schuh, 2011 - eastern Asia
 Leucophoroptera Poppius, 1921 - Australia
 Missanos Menard & Schuh, 2011 - eastern Asia
 Neaitkenia Menard & Schuh, 2011 - Australia
 Neoleucophoroptera Menard & Schuh, 2011 - eastern Asia
 Papuamimus Schuh, 1984 - eastern Asia
 Papuamiroides Menard & Schuh, 2011 - eastern Asia
 Pseudohallodapocoris Schuh, 1984 - eastern Asia
 Sejanus Distant, 1910 - eastern Asia, Australia
 Solomonomimus Schuh, 1984 - eastern Asia
 Transleucophoroptera Menard & Schuh, 2011 - eastern Asia
 Trichocephalocapsus Schuh, 1984 - eastern Asia
 Waterhouseana Carvalho, 1973 - eastern Asia
 Subtribe Tuxedoina Schuh & Menard, 2013
 Ephippiocoris Poppius, 1912 - Palearctic
 Pseudophylus Yasunaga, 1999 - Palearctic
 Tuxedo Schuh, 2001 - western North America

References

Phylinae